Marian Adam Konieczny (13 January 1930, Jasionów – 25 July 2017 Jaroszowiec) was a Polish sculptor and politician, Professor and Dean at the Faculty of Sculpture of the Jan Matejko Academy of Fine Arts in Kraków.

Life
A 1954 graduate of the Akademia Sztuk Pięknych w Krakowie (Jan Matejko Academy of Fine Arts) in Kraków, Konieczny was a student of Xawery Dunikowski.  He was a professor and rector of the Academy from 1972 to 1981.  Konieczny sculpted many notable monuments, such as the Warsaw Nike, Martyrs Memorial in Algiers, General Tadeusz Kosciuszko in Philadelphia and Pope John Paul II in Leżajsk. In 2000, President Aleksander Kwasniewski awarded him the Commander's Cross with Star of the Order of Polonia Restituta. 
His monument of Vladimir Lenin in Nowa Huta was the biggest Lenin's monument in Poland, removed in 1989. Lenin's heel was damaged in 1979 as the result of a weak explosion. In 2009, he was awarded the Gold Medal of the Medal for Merit to Culture – Gloria Artis.

Konieczny died in Jasionów, Podkarpackie Voivodeship, on 25 July 2017 at the age of 87.

Gallery

See also
Art of Poland

Notes

1930 births
2017 deaths
Polish sculptors
Polish male sculptors
People from Brzozów County
Commanders with Star of the Order of Polonia Restituta
Recipients of the Medal for Merit to Culture – Gloria Artis
Recipients of the State Award Badge (Poland)